Phenacostethus is a genus of fishes in the family Phallostethidae found in freshwater and brackish habitats in southeast Asia.

Species
The currently recognized species in this genus are:
 Phenacostethus posthon T. R. Roberts, 1971
 Phenacostethus smithi G. S. Myers, 1928 (Smith's priapium fish)
 Phenacostethus trewavasae Parenti, 1986

References

Phallostethinae